Kircubbin is a village and townland in County Down, Northern Ireland. The village had a population of 1,153 people in the 2011 Census.

History
The settlement was originally known as Kilcubin, which is thought to come from Irish Cill Ghobáin, meaning "St Goban's church". This later became Kirkcubbin, from the Ulster-Scots word for church, kirk.

1798 Rebellion
The Rev. William Warwick, a Presbyterian minister in Kircubbin, was hanged in 1798 near his church, for the writing of seditious documents in support of the Irish Rebellion of 1798.

The Troubles
Two significant incidents occurred during the Troubles. In 1974, St Mary Star of the Sea Church, Nunsquarter, which still stands and is used today, was badly damaged by a bomb planted at the side door of the chapel. One man, a local joiner who was working in the church hall adjacent to the church, left the premises shortly before the bomb went off.

Boys' Home abuse
In 2014, the Christian Brothers admitted to the physical and sexual abuse of boys in their care from 1951 to 1985 at the De La Salle Boys' Home, Rubane House, Kircubbin, often referred to as the "Kircubbin Boys' Home". or simply "Kircubbin", and issued an apology to its victims.

Population

2011 Census
In the 2011 Census Kircubbin had a population of 1,153 (471 households).

2001 Census
Kircubbin is classified as a village by the Northern Ireland Statistics and Research Agency (NISRA) (i.e. with population between 1,000 and 2,250 people). On Census day (29 April 2001) there were 1,214 people living in Kircubbin. Of these:
25.0% were aged under 16 years and 17.4% were aged 60 and over
48.9% of the population were male and the other 51.1% were female
66.8% were from a Catholic background and 31.2% were Protestant

Economy
In 2013, Echlinville Distillery was granted the first licence to distil spirits in Northern Ireland in over 130 years.

References

External links
 Culture Northern Ireland
 Kircubbin website
 Kircubbin Integrated Primary School

Villages in County Down
Townlands of County Down
Civil parish of Inishargy